Vix is a commune in the Côte-d'Or department in eastern France.

Archaeology

The area around the village of Vix is the site of an important prehistoric complex from the Celtic Late Hallstatt and Early La Tène periods, comprising an important fortified settlement and several burial mounds. The most famous of the latter, the Vix Grave, also known as the grave of the Lady of Vix, dates to circa 500 BC. Her grave had never been looted and contained remarkably rich grave offerings, including a great deal of  jewellery and the Vix krater, the largest known metal vessel from antiquity.

Population

See also
Communes of the Côte-d'Or department
Girart de Roussillon

References

Communes of Côte-d'Or
Lingones
Champagne (province)